Kielland is a Norwegian surname. Notable people with the surname include:

Alexander Kielland (1849–1906), Norwegian writer
Axel Christian Zetlitz Kielland (1853–1924), Norwegian civil servant and diplomat
Christian Bendz Kielland (1858–1934), Norwegian civil servant
Gabriel Kielland (1871–1960), Norwegian architect, painter and designer
Gabriel Schanche Kielland (1760–1821), Norwegian businessman and ship owner
Gustava Kielland (1800–1889), Norwegian author and missionary pioneer
Jacob Christie Kielland (1897–1972), Norwegian architect
Jacob Kielland (officer) (1825–1889), Norwegian naval officer and politician
Jacob Kielland (priest) (1841–1915), Norwegian priest and politician
Jacob Kielland (businessman) (1788–1863), Norwegian businessperson, consul and politician
Jens Zetlitz Monrad Kielland (1866–1926), Norwegian architect
Jens Zetlitz Kielland  (1816–1881), Norwegian consul and artist
Jonas Schanche Kielland (born 1863) (1863–1925), Norwegian jurist and politician
Jonas Schanche Kielland (1791–1852), Norwegian consul and politician
Kitty Lange Kielland (1843–1914), Norwegian landscape painter
Olav Kielland (1901–1985), Norwegian composer and conductor
Tycho Kielland (1854–1904), Norwegian jurist

See also
Per Smith-Kielland (1891–1921), Norwegian painter 
Ingvald M. Smith-Kielland (born 1919), Norwegian military officer and diplomat 
Alexander L. Kielland (platform), Norwegian semi-submersible drilling rig that capsized in 1980

Norwegian-language surnames